Garstad is a village in the municipality of Nærøysund in Trøndelag county, Norway. Garstad Church is located in this village. Just to the west of the village lies the Vikna Wind Farm.

References

Villages in Trøndelag
Nærøysund
Vikna